George Crowther  may refer to:

George Calhoun Crowther (1849–1914), U.S. Representative from Missouri
 George Crowther, translated La Dentellière (The Lacemaker), into English in 1976
George Crowther (American football) (1891–1963), American football player
George Crowther (footballer) (1891–?), former professional footballer
George Henry Crowther (1854–1918) founded Brighton Grammar School in 1882